Yanglingang is a small fishing village located on the border between Shanghai and Jiangsu province, China. The village has approximately fifty families, who obtain their sustenance by fishing and obtaining drinking water from the Yangtze River, which has significant problems with pollution. The village is "surrounded by power plants, paper-making factories, and chemical plants". Village residents live on their boats.

See also

 List of fishing villages
 List of villages in China

References

Villages in China
Fishing communities